is a 2012 Japanese film written and directed by Itsuji Itao.

Cast
 Itsuji Itao
 Tadanobu Asano 
 Satomi Ishihara
 Seiji Rokkaku as Morinoya Kinta

References

External links
 

Films directed by Itsuji Itao
2012 films
2010s Japanese films
2010s Japanese-language films